is a Japanese professional tennis player. She has been ranked world No. 1 in singles by the Women's Tennis Association (WTA) and is the first Asian player to hold the top ranking in singles. Osaka is a four-time Grand Slam singles champion, with two Australian Open and two US Open titles. Her seven titles on the WTA Tour also include two at the Premier Mandatory level. At the 2018 US Open and the 2019 Australian Open, Osaka won her first two major titles in back-to-back tournaments. She was the first woman to win successive major singles titles since Serena Williams in 2015, and the first to win her first two in successive majors since Jennifer Capriati in 2001.

Born in Japan to a Haitian-American father and a Japanese mother, Osaka has lived and trained in the United States since age three. She came to prominence at age 16 when she defeated former US Open champion Samantha Stosur in her WTA Tour debut at the 2014 Stanford Classic. Two years later, she reached her first WTA final at the 2016 Pan Pacific Open in Tokyo to enter the top 50 of the WTA rankings. Osaka made her breakthrough into the upper echelon of women's tennis in 2018 when she won her first WTA title at the Indian Wells Open. Later in the year, she defeated 23-time Grand Slam singles champion Serena Williams in the final of the US Open to become the first Japanese player to win a major singles title. In mid-2021, suffering from depression and other issues, Osaka retired from the French Open, dropped out of Wimbledon, and lost early at the US Open. She closed down the rest of her tennis season to focus on family and health. From 2018 to 2021, Osaka won a major singles title in four consecutive years, with her streak ending in 2022.

Osaka is one of the world's most marketable athletes, having been ranked eighth among all athletes in endorsement income in 2020. She was also the highest-earning female athlete of all time by annual income that year. Osaka has gained significant recognition as an activist, having showcased support for the Black Lives Matter movement in conjunction with her matches. She was named one of the 2020 Sports Illustrated Sportspersons of the Year for her activism largely as part of her US Open championship run, and was also included on Times annual list of the 100 most influential people in the world in 2019, 2020 and 2021. Moreover, she was the 2021 Laureus World Sportswoman of the Year. At the 2020 Tokyo Olympics, she became the first tennis player to light the Olympic cauldron during the opening ceremony. On the court, Osaka has an aggressive playing style with a powerful serve that can reach .

Early life and background
Her mother is from Nemuro, Hokkaido, Japan, and her father is from Jacmel, Haiti. She has an older sister, Mari, who is a former professional tennis player. The two girls were given their mother's family name for practical reasons when the family lived in Japan. Osaka's parents met when her father was visiting Hokkaido while he was a college student in New York.

When Osaka was three years old, her family moved from Japan to Elmont, New York on Long Island to live with her father's parents. Her father was inspired to teach his daughters how to play tennis by watching the Williams sisters compete at the 1999 French Open. Having little experience as a tennis player himself, he sought to emulate how Richard Williams trained his daughters to become two of the best players in the world, despite having never played the sport. François remarked that "the blueprint was already there. I just had to follow it," with regard to the detailed plan Richard had developed for his daughters. He began coaching Naomi and Mari once they settled in the United States. In 2006, her family moved to Florida when she was eight or nine years old so that they would have better opportunities to train. She practiced on the Pembroke Pines public courts during the day and was homeschooled at night. When she was 15years old, she began working with Patrick Tauma at the ISP Academy. In 2014, she moved to the Harold Solomon Tennis Academy. She later trained at the ProWorld Tennis Academy.

Although Osaka was raised in the United States, her parents decided that their daughters would represent Japan. They said, "We made the decision that Naomi would represent Japan at an early age. She was born in Osaka and was brought up in a household of Japanese and Haitian culture. Quite simply, Naomi and her sister Mari have always felt Japanese so that was our only rationale. It was never a financially motivated decision nor were we ever swayed either way by any national federation." This decision may have also been motivated by a lack of interest from the United States Tennis Association (USTA) when she was still a young player. The USTA later offered her the opportunity to train at their national training center in Boca Raton, Florida when she was 16 years old, but she declined.

Professional career

2011–2015: First WTA Tour match win

Osaka never competed on the ITF Junior Circuit, the premier international junior tour, and only played in a small number of junior tournaments at any age level. She instead skipped to the ITF Women's Circuit and played her first qualifying match in October 2011 on her 14th birthday. She then made her professional main-draw debut in doubles at her next tournament in March with her sister Mari. Meanwhile, she did not qualify for her first singles main draw until July in her seventh such attempt. Her best result of the 2012 season came at a $10K event in Amelia Island, where she lost to her sister in the semifinals. Osaka has never won a title at the ITF level, only managing to finish runner-up on four occasions. Her first two finals came at the $25K level, one of which was in June 2013 in El Paso, Texas. The other was in March 2014 in Irapuato, Mexico and included a victory over her sister.

In September 2013, Osaka turned professional shortly before turning 16 years old. She entered her first two qualifying draws on the WTA Tour that same month at the Challenge Bell in Quebec and the Pan Pacific Open in Tokyo. The latter event was her first opportunity to compete professionally in Japan. The following summer, Osaka qualified for her first WTA Tour main draw at the 2014 Stanford Classic. In her tour level debut, she upset world  19, Samantha Stosur, in a tight match where she saved a match point in the second set tiebreak and came back from a 5–3 deficit in the third set. She was still just 16 years old and ranked No. 406 at the time. Osaka also won a match as a wildcard at the Japan Women's Open, her only other WTA main draw of the year. These victories helped her progress into the top 250 of the rankings before the end of the season.

Despite not winning another WTA Tour main-draw singles match in 2015, Osaka continued to climb up the rankings. She reached her two highest level ITF finals, the first at the $75K Kangaroo Cup in Japan and the second at the $50K Surbiton Trophy in the United Kingdom. Following these runner-up results, Osaka was ranked high enough to enter qualifying at the last two Grand Slam singles events of the year, Wimbledon and the US Open. She won her first match at the US Open, but was unable to qualify for either main draw. Nonetheless, Osaka had a strong finish to the year. In October during the WTA Finals, she won the Rising Stars Invitational four-player exhibition tournament, defeating heavy favorite and world No. 35, Caroline Garcia, in the final. Continuing to play in November, Osaka then reached the biggest final of her career at the WTA 125 Hua Hin Championships in Thailand. After a semifinal at a $75K event in Japan, she finished the year ranked No. 144.

2016: Newcomer of the Year, top 50

Osaka began the season playing three tournaments in Australia. Her results during this stretch were good enough to bring her near the top 100, which allowed her to play in WTA Tour-level events all year. Most notably, she qualified for her first Grand Slam main draw at the Australian Open and made it to the third round. In particular, she upset No. 21, Elina Svitolina, in straight sets in the second round before losing to No. 16, Victoria Azarenka. Back in the United States, Osaka received a wildcard into the Miami Open, her first Premier Mandatory main draw. During the event, she won two matches including a victory over No. 18, Sara Errani. With this success, she progressed into the top 100 of the WTA rankings for the first time.

In the clay-court events leading up to the French Open, Osaka needed to qualify for every event she entered. She only managed to do so at a single event, the Charleston Open, where she lost her only match in the main draw. Nonetheless, Osaka was ranked high enough to be directly accepted into the main draw of the French Open. In her debut at the tournament, she recorded her only two clay-court match wins of the season. She also won the first set against No. 6 Simona Halep, but ultimately lost the match. She then did not play the grass-court season after suffering an injury shortly after the French Open.

Osaka returned to tennis in the middle of July. At the US Open in August, she reached the third round at a Grand Slam event for the third time that year. She upset No. 30 CoCo Vandeweghe in the first round before losing to No. 9 Madison Keys, in three sets. During her match against Keys, she had a 5–1 lead in the third set before ultimately losing in a tiebreak. After the tournament, Osaka began the Asian hardcourt season with two tournaments in Tokyo, first losing in the second round at the Japan Open. Having already reached her first two career WTA quarterfinals earlier in the year, she then made her breakthrough as a wildcard at the Premier level Pan Pacific Open. She upset No. 12 Dominika Cibulková and No. 20 Svitolina on the road to making her first WTA final at the age of 18. At the time, Cibulkova was the highest-ranked player she ever defeated. Additionally, she was the first Japanese player to contest the final at the event since Kimiko Date in 1995. Osaka ultimately finished runner-up to Caroline Wozniacki. Nonetheless, she entered the top 50 of the WTA rankings for the first time. At the end of the season, she was named the WTA Newcomer of the Year.

2017: Two top-10 victories
After her huge improvement the previous year, Osaka was unable to set a new career-high ranking in 2017. Nonetheless, she maintained a steady ranking throughout the season, rising no higher than No. 44 while falling no lower than No. 68, her year-end ranking. She did not win more than two main draw matches at any event all year.

Osaka's best tournament result of the season came at the Canadian Open, where she reached the round of sixteen as a qualifier. During the event, she upset No. 16 Anastasija Sevastova before needing to retire against world No. 1, Karolína Plíšková, due to an abdominal injury. She had won the second set against Plíšková. Her next best results of the year came at the last two major events of the season, where she made it to the third round at each of Wimbledon and the US Open. She had a strong debut at Wimbledon, upsetting No. 23 Barbora Strýcová, before losing to No. 11 Venus Williams. Her US Open was then highlighted by her first-round win against defending champion and No. 6, Angelique Kerber, the first top-ten victory of Osaka's career. However, her run was ended by veteran qualifier Kaia Kanepi. This was the second consecutive year she lost in the third round of the US Open, after having at least a one-break lead in the third set.

Osaka in particular struggled to play on clay courts. After winning her first two matches at the Charleston Open, she did not win another main-draw match on clay the remainder of the season. Osaka did well in her first full grass-court season on the WTA Tour, going 4–4 behind her performance at Wimbledon. Her biggest wins of the year all came on hardcourt. In addition to her results at the Canadian Open and the US Open, she also recorded a second top-ten victory over No. 5, Venus Williams, at the Hong Kong Open, her last tournament of the year.

2018: US Open champion, world No. 4

Following her lack of improvement in 2017, Osaka hired Sascha Bajin to be her coach in the offseason. In their second tournament together, Osaka produced her career best result at a Grand Slam event. At the Australian Open, she reached the fourth round after defeating two top-20 players in Elena Vesnina and hometown favorite Ashleigh Barty, ultimately losing to world No. 1, Simona Halep. This result helped her return to the top 50 within the next month.

At the Indian Wells Open, Osaka had the next big breakthrough of her career. Having never won a professional title or made it past the third round at a Premier Mandatory event, she won the tournament convincingly, only dropping one set in the middle round of the tournament. In the quarterfinals and semifinals, she defeated two top-five opponents in Karolína Plíšková and Halep, the latter of which was her first victory over a current No. 1 player. She then closed out the tournament with a win in the final over fellow up-and-coming player Daria Kasatkina, making her the youngest champion at the event in ten years. With her first title, she surged past her previous career-high ranking to No. 22 in the world. Osaka played the following week as well at the Miami Open and extended her win streak by one additional match in her first meeting against her childhood idol Serena Williams, who was competing in just her second tournament back from maternity leave.

After her success in the early months of the season, Osaka had a rather quiet middle of the year. She reached the third round at both the French Open and Wimbledon, matching her best performance at each tournament. The closest she came to winning another tournament was on grass at the Nottingham Open, where she lost to top seed Barty in the semifinals. 

Osaka did not have another breakthrough result until the US Open, where she won her second title of the year. Like at Indian Wells, she only dropped one set in the middle round of the event, this time to No. 20 Aryna Sabalenka. In the three early rounds, she only lost a total of seven games and notably recorded a double bagel victory against Aliaksandra Sasnovich. Osaka was drawn against Madison Keys in the semifinals, and was able to avenge her tough loss from the 2016 US Open to advance to the final. In the final, she defeated Serena Williams for the second time in 2018 to win her first major title. The match was marred by an on-court dispute between Williams and the umpire highlighted by Williams receiving a game penalty and boos from the crowd both during the match and the award ceremony. Osaka later said that the win was "a little bit bittersweet" and "it wasn't necessarily the happiest memory." Nonetheless, she became the first Japanese woman to contest a major singles final and the first Japanese Grand Slam singles champion.

Now ranked in the top ten, Osaka extended her win streak to ten matches by reaching the final at the Pan Pacific Open in Tokyo for the second time in her career. Plíšková was able to end her win streak in the final. Osaka then reached the semifinals at the Premier Mandatory China Open. With her third consecutive deep run, she rose to a career-best ranking of world No. 4, matching the record of Kimiko Date and Kei Nishikori for the highest ranking held by a Japanese player in history. Osaka closed out the year by participating at the WTA Finals, where she was grouped with Sloane Stephens, Angelique Kerber, and Kiki Bertens. She lost all three of her round-robin matches, notably retiring against Bertens due to a hamstring injury to end her season. Osaka finished the year as the WTA Tour leader in prize money, having earned almost $6.4 million.

2019: Australian Open title, world No. 1
Osaka entered the Australian Open as the fourth seed and also one of eleven players in contention for the world No. 1 ranking. She made it to the final against Petra Kvitová, having beaten Hsieh Su-wei in the third round despite being one set, 2–4 and 0–40 down at one point. Anastasija Sevastova also won the first set against her in the fourth round, while No. 8 Karolína Plíšková pushed her to three sets in the semifinals. After Osaka won the first set in the final, Kvitová saved three championship points before breaking Osaka in back-to-back service games to win the second set. Nonetheless, Osaka recovered to win the championship. She was the first woman to win consecutive major singles titles since Serena Williams in 2015, and was the first player to follow up her first Grand Slam singles title with another at the next such event since Jennifer Capriati in 2001. She also became the first Asian player to be ranked No. 1 in the world in singles. Despite this title, she parted ways with her coach Sascha Bajin following the tournament.

Osaka struggled after the Australian Open. She lost in the fourth and third rounds at the two Premier Mandatory tournaments in March, the Indian Wells Open and the Miami Open. After beginning the clay-court season with a semifinal at the Stuttgart Open where she withdrew due to an abdominal injury, her best results were two quarterfinals at the Madrid Open and the Italian Open. She also withdrew from the latter due to a right hand injury. Osaka matched her best result at the French Open, losing to Kateřina Siniaková in the third round. During the grass-court season, Osaka lost in the early rounds to Yulia Putintseva at both tournaments she entered, including the first round at Wimbledon. As a result, she lost the No. 1 ranking to Ashleigh Barty.

Before the US Open, Osaka made the quarterfinals at the two Premier 5 tournaments in August, the Canadian Open and the Cincinnati Open, where she was defeated by Serena Williams and Sofia Kenin respectively. These performances helped her regain the No. 1 ranking so that she had the top seed at the US Open. Nonetheless, her title defense came to an end in the fourth round against Belinda Bencic, who defeated her for the third time during the year. She then fell to No. 4 in the world. Following the tournament, Osaka went back to having her father as her coach. This change had an immediate impact, as Osaka won her next two tournaments. First, she won the Pan Pacific Open in her hometown of Osaka, defeating Anastasia Pavlyuchenkova in the final. Two weeks later, she won the Premier Mandatory China Open. During the tournament, she defeated reigning US Open champion Bianca Andreescu in the quarterfinals and world No. 1 and reigning French Open champion Ashleigh Barty in the final, both in three sets after losing the first. This was Andreescu's first loss since March. These results brought her to No. 3 in the world. At the end of the season, Osaka qualified for the WTA Finals for the second consecutive year. However, after defeating Petra Kvitová in her first match, she withdrew due to injury.

2020: Second US Open title

Osaka only played four tournaments in 2020, largely due to the COVID-19 pandemic. Before the tour shutdown, she lost to No. 2 Karolína Plíšková in a semifinal at the Brisbane International and Coco Gauff in the third round of the Australian Open, squandering a chance to serve for the match in the former. When the tour resumed, Osaka played the Cincinnati Open and the US Open, which were held in back-to-back weeks in New York. Osaka did not lose a match at either event. At the Cincinnati Open, she defeated four players ranked in the 20s before defaulting in the final against Victoria Azarenka due to a hamstring injury. Both Osaka and Azarenka reached the final again at the US Open, where Osaka became the first player to win a US Open women's singles final by coming from a set down since 1994. This was her second US Open title in three years. Following the US Open, Osaka skipped the French Open and ended her season because of her lingering hamstring injury.

During both of these tournaments in New York, Osaka drew attention for her activism. She had initially withdrawn from the Cincinnati Open before the semifinal to raise awareness for the police shooting of Jacob Blake, only staying in the tournament after they chose to support her cause by postponing the event for a day. At the US Open, Osaka walked onto the court for her seven matches wearing a different black mask, each of which with the name of an African American who had been killed in recent years often without significant repercussions.

2021: Australian Open title, mental health issues
Osaka was seeded third at the 2021 Australian Open. She recorded straight-set wins over Anastasia Pavlyuchenkova, Caroline Garcia, and Ons Jabeur, before defeating Garbiñe Muguruza in three sets in the fourth round despite facing match points during the third set (the only match in which she lost a set during the tournament). She went on to defeat Hsieh Su-wei in the quarterfinals, Serena Williams in the semifinals, and 22nd seed Jennifer Brady in the final to claim her second Australian Open title.
She became one of only three players in the Open Era to win her first four Grand Slam finals, alongside Roger Federer and Monica Seles.

Osaka returned to the Miami Open as the second seed, making the quarterfinals for the first time. She lost the quarterfinal in a shock defeat to Maria Sakkari, winning just four games. As a result, Osaka missed out on regaining the No. 1 ranking.

Osaka was seeded second at the French Open. Shortly before the start of the tournament, she announced that she would not conduct her mandatory media assignments. After Osaka won her first match in straight sets and did not hold a press conference, she was fined $15,000 and threatened with rising levels of fines and expulsion. The following day, she announced her withdrawal from the tournament, citing mental health issues. Many fellow athletes and sponsors have voiced support for Osaka, with some noting a rarely discussed issue of mental health, although the overall reaction from the wider tennis community was mixed. On June 17, Osaka's agent announced that she would not participate in the upcoming Wimbledon Championships but would take part in the Tokyo Olympics.

Osaka would later return to action at the Cincinnati Open where she was defending finalist. She beat Coco Gauff in the second round but was upset by Jil Teichmann in the third round, both in three sets.

At the US Open, Osaka failed to defend her title, losing her composure and the match to the eventual tournament runner-up, Canadian Leylah Fernandez in the third round, despite serving for the match in the second set. During the match, Osaka threw her racket and received a code violation for hitting a ball into the stands. In her post-match press conference, Osaka announced another hiatus from the sport "for a while", revealing that winning did not make her happy anymore.

2022: Miami Open final
Osaka returned to competition at the Melbourne Summer Set 1 tournament seeded No. 1 and made the semifinals, before withdrawing due to an abdominal injury. Her next tournament was the Australian Open, where she was seeded 13th and attempting to defend her title. However, she was eliminated in the third round by Amanda Anisimova, in three sets. Osaka described being happy despite the loss and discussed steps she is taking to improve her mental health and have "more fun on the court".

She dropped 71 spots in the WTA rankings to No. 85 following the tournament, with the tournament absences in 2021 contributing to the drop.

In March, Osaka entered the Indian Wells Open where she beat Sloane Stephens in the first round, but lost to Veronika Kudermetova in straight sets in the second. Osaka was upset by a heckler in the crowd during the second round and was in tears during the match. Interviewed after the match, she compared her treatment to heckling at the tournament in 2001 that led the Williams sisters to boycott it for 13 years.

The following week, Osaka entered the Miami Open. She reached her first final since the 2021 Australian Open after defeating 22nd seed Belinda Bencic in the semifinals. Ranked 77 at the time, she became the lowest ranked finalist in the tournament's history. However, she lost the final to second seed Iga Świątek, in straight sets.

Following a right ankle injury at the Madrid Open, Osaka withdrew from the Italian Open. On May 23, she lost in the first round of the French Open to Anisimova.

Playing for the first time since the French Open, Osaka won her first-round match at San Jose against Zheng Qinwen in three sets, but lost in the next round to Coco Gauff, in straight sets. At the Canadian Open, Osaka retired from her first match against Kaia Kanepi due to back injury. Against home favorite Danielle Collins, Osaka started positive into the US Open but lost the first set in a tiebreak, and her first-round match in two sets.
Her troubles continued at the 2022 Toray Pan Pacific Open where as the defending champion she withdrew in the second round citing abdominal pain, having played only one game in her first round match against Daria Gavrilova who retired due to knee injury.

2023: Pregnancy
Days before the Australian Open 2023 Osaka announced her withdrawal from the championships, as she was expecting her first child. Osaka's 2023 season was curtailed due to Osaka expecting with rapper Cordae. In her withdrawal message she confirmed with fans that she will be back for the Australian Swing in 2024.

National representation

Fed Cup
Osaka made her Fed Cup debut for Japan in 2017, while the team was competing in the Asia/Oceania Zone Group I. Japan won all nine of their rubbers to advance out of their round-robin pool. Although Osaka won her singles match in the play-off against Kazakhstan, the team lost their other two matches and was not able to advance. The following year with Osaka absent, Japan was able to defeat Kazakhstan in the same group to advance to the 2018 World Group II Play-offs. In this stage, they hosted Great Britain in a usual five rubber tie. At this point, Osaka returned to the team and won her opening match against Heather Watson. After she lost her next rubber to Johanna Konta, Kurumi Nara was also able to defeat Watson to set up a decisive doubles match. Japan won that final rubber to earn promotion to World Group II in 2019.

Hopman Cup
Osaka made her Hopman Cup debut in 2018 with Yūichi Sugita. Japan was making their first appearance at the exhibition tournament since 2001. They were grouped with Switzerland, the United States, and Russia, and lost all three of their ties. Osaka's only match win came in singles against Russian Anastasia Pavlyuchenkova. She also had a big highlight in the mixed doubles match against Switzerland when she served an ace past Roger Federer.

Olympics

Osaka lit the Olympic cauldron during the opening ceremony. Coming into Tokyo Olympics, Osaka was ranked 2nd in the world. She lost in the 3rd round of the games to eventual finalist and silver medalist Markéta Vondroušová after two straight set victories.

Playing style

Osaka is an aggressive baseline player. She has excellent raw power, especially on her forehand and her serve. While she can use her power to hit high numbers of winners, Osaka's key to success is to be able to win long rallies. One of the first notable instances in which that strategy proved successful was when Osaka made her first career WTA final at the 2016 Pan Pacific Open.

Osaka credited improving her mental approach and cutting down on unforced errors for her breakthrough season in 2018. At the Wuhan Open towards the end of the year, she noted, "I think my biggest improvement is mental. My game is more consistent, there are not so many unforced errors. I'm not sure how many I hit today, but sometimes last year I was hitting a lot!" She attributed some of these changes to her coach Sascha Bajin, saying, "Since I was working with [Bajin] — and I tend to be a bit negative on myself — I feel like I've gotten a little bit more optimistic ... I fight myself a lot, so he's sort of been, like, the peacemaker." Bajin also agreed with Osaka on the impact of having a patient, positive approach in each match.

Coaches
Osaka was coached by her father Leonard François from the age of three. Patrick Tauma was one of her first coaches after she began playing on the ITF Women's Circuit. He was her coach in 2013 when she reached her first ITF final. In 2014, she spent seven months training at an academy run by Harold Solomon, a former top five player and French Open finalist who has coached many top women's tennis players including Jennifer Capriati and Mary Joe Fernández. Under Solomon, Osaka defeated Sam Stosur for her first WTA match win. Following her loss at the 2016 US Open where she could not convert a 5–1 lead in the third set, the Japan Tennis Association helped arrange for David Taylor to be her new coach.

After the 2017 season, Osaka switched coaches to Sascha Bajin, who had previously served as a hitting partner to top players such as Serena Williams, Victoria Azarenka, and Caroline Wozniacki. With Bajin as her coach, Osaka won her first Premier Mandatory title and two Grand Slam singles titles. She also rose to No. 1 in the world after having never previously been ranked above No. 40. Bajin was named the inaugural WTA Coach of the Year in 2018. Shortly after her 2019 Australian Open title, Osaka surprisingly split with Bajin, saying, she "wouldn't put success over [her] happiness." She hired Jermaine Jenkins to be her new coach from March until October. Jenkins had previously worked as a hitting partner for Venus Williams. Osaka temporarily replaced him with her father in September. She won her first two tournaments with him back as her coach. She subsequently hired Wim Fissette at the start of the 2020 season.

Endorsements
Osaka is one of the most marketable athletes in the world. She earned an estimated $16 million in endorsements alone in 2019, which placed her second among female athletes behind only Serena Williams who earned $25 million. The following year, she became the highest-paid female athlete of all time, having earned $37.4 million in total, including $34 million in endorsements. Overall, she was the 29th highest-paid athlete in 2020 and the 8th highest-paid athlete in endorsements alone.

Nike has been Osaka's apparel sponsor since 2019, having replaced Adidas who had sponsored her for four years. With Nike, Osaka has a clothing collection featuring her monogram logo that uses her initials and is inspired by the Japanese flag. The Japanese sporting equipment manufacturer Yonex has supplied her with rackets since 2008. She plays with the Yonex Ezone 98 racket, equipped with Polytour Pro 125 and Rexis 130 strings. Osaka has been represented by the IMG management company since 2016. In 2022, Osaka left IMG, in order to set up her own sports management agency, Evolve, alongside her agent, Stuart Duguid. On June 20, 2022, Osaka announced that she had signed Nick Kyrgios as her first client.

Osaka is a brand ambassador for Japanese automobile manufacturer Nissan and Japanese electronics manufacturer Citizen Watch. She also endorses several other Japanese companies, including noodle maker Nissin Foods, cosmetics producer Shiseido, the broadcasting station Wowow, and airline All Nippon Airways (ANA).

In January 2021, Osaka was named the brand ambassador for Tag Heuer watches, as well as for Louis Vuitton; she appeared in their Spring-Summer 2021 campaign. She is also endorsed by Beats Electronics, Bodyarmor SuperDrink, Mastercard, Panasonic, FTX, PlayStation, Levi's, Airbnb, Sweetgreen, Workday, and GoDaddy. Her endorsement portfolio was estimated to earn Osaka up to $60 million per year. As a result of FTX's $11-billion bankruptcy, Osaka was sued for her involvement. In February 2022, the U.S. 11th Circuit Court of Appeals ruled in a lawsuit against Bitconnect that the Securities Act of 1933 extends to targeted solicitation using social media.

Panasonic announced the signing of Osaka as brand ambassador in June 2021. She is a promoter of the "Panasonic Green Impact" initiative alongside Olympic swimmer Michael Phelps and Olympic figure skater Nathan Chen. Panasonic enlisted the three celebrity athletes for its sustainability mission and they were part of an ad campaign for climate change that included individual commercials and a commercial in which all three athletes are featured.

Activism
Osaka has become a leading activist in professional tennis. Her decision to withdraw from the 2020 Cincinnati Open in New York to raise awareness for the police shooting of Jacob Blake led the tournament to postpone all Association of Tennis Professionals (ATP) and Women's Tennis Association (WTA) matches for a day in support of her cause. At the 2020 US Open beginning the following week, each mask she wore as she walked onto the court (due to the COVID-19 pandemic) prominently displayed the name of an African American who had been killed in the preceding few years, the majority in the year before the tournament, and the majority killed by police. She highlighted Breonna Taylor, Elijah McClain, Ahmaud Arbery, Trayvon Martin, George Floyd, Philando Castile, and Tamir Rice; and was praised directly by the parents of Martin and Arbery. Prior to these acts of activism, Osaka had also travelled to Minnesota to attend the protests of the murder of George Floyd. She outlined her personal reasons for supporting the Black Lives Matter movement and protesting against police brutality in an op-ed in Esquire magazine.

Osaka was named a 2020 Sports Illustrated Sportsperson of the Year for her activism alongside the year's other prominent activist sports champions LeBron James, Breanna Stewart, and Patrick Mahomes, as well as medical worker Laurent Duvernay-Tardif. She was also honored as one of the Time 100 most influential people in the world in 2020 for her activism, having also been named to the list in 2019 for representing professional tennis well as an excellent role model and a major champion. Osaka's activism has drawn attention from the scholarly community studying celebrity and advocacy, especially during the COVID-19 pandemic. 

Osaka has been featured as the main character in a manga series published by Kodansha in Nakayoshi, a leading Japanese shojo magazine. The series is being drawn by Futago Kamikita and was made with the help of Osaka's sister Mari. The first edition appeared in the February 2021 issue of the magazine, which was released in December 2020.
In March 2021, Osaka spoke out against anti-Asian hate crimes.

Personal life
Osaka had a shy, reserved personality in her early years on the WTA Tour. Her former coach Sascha Bajin was initially confused by her personality, saying, "I thought she was a little bit more of a diva because she didn't talk much. She doesn't really look at someone's eyes, but that's just because she was always so shy ... Back then I didn't know for what reason." Osaka is also very frank and is regarded as having a dry sense of humor. During her 2018 Indian Wells Open victory speech, she began by saying "Um, hello ... I'm Naom ... oh never mind" and later noted, "This is probably going to be the worst acceptance speech of all time" after being worried about forgetting whom to thank, and appearing to nearly forget to thank her opponent, Daria Kasatkina as well as one of her sponsors.

Osaka began a relationship with American rapper Cordae in 2019.

In 2021, Osaka became a co-owner of the North Carolina Courage in the National Women's Soccer League, the top level of women's soccer in the U.S. Osaka is an investor in a professional pickleball team which will be based in Miami, Florida, beginning in 2023.

In May 2022, Osaka announced after being represented by IMG for six years, she is partnering with her agent, Stuart Duguid to form her own sports agency, Evolve. Her contract with IMG expired at the end of 2021, and the renewal talks were stalled. Osaka and Duguid will have equity stakes in the agency, and it will only be representing a few clients.

In January 2023, not long after withdrawing from the Australian Open, Osaka revealed that she was pregnant with her first child with rapper Cordae. As part of the announcement, Osaka confirmed she hoped to return to tennis sometime in 2024.

Mental health challenges
Osaka has suffered with depression since the 2018 US Open. In May 2021, she refused to take part in required press conferences during the French Open and was subsequently fined $15,000 and threatened with expulsion from the tournament. On May 31, Osaka withdrew from the event to deal with her mental health and well-being. Less than a month later she also pulled out of Wimbledon citing "She is taking some personal time with friends and family." She attempted to come back for the Olympics but the pressure of returning to the limelight was a factor in her third round loss.

In September at the US Open, she lost to Leylah Fernandez and in the process threw her racket three times and received a code violation for firing a ball at the spectators. Afterwards she said "I'm not really sure why" and "recently I feel very anxious when things don't go my way." Osaka then announced she was taking an indefinite break from the sport. Later in 2021, she shared with Victoria's Secret that she is being helped by therapy, her dog, calming music, and slowing down.

At the 2022 Indian Wells Open, a heckler unsettled Osaka to the point of tears after which she had to seek therapy. She said the consistent therapy really helped and she is better prepared for incidents in the future. In a May 2022 interview, Osaka shared that while there have been ups and downs, she feels very content with her mental health journey.

Career statistics

Grand Slam singles performance timeline

Grand Slam tournament finals

Singles: 4 (4 titles)

See also
 Naomi Osaka (TV series)

References

External links

  
 
 
 

 
1997 births
Living people
21st-century Japanese women
Japanese female tennis players
Japanese people of Haitian descent
Japanese expatriates in the United States
Australian Open (tennis) champions
Grand Slam (tennis) champions in women's singles
Hopman Cup competitors
Japanese-American tennis players
North Carolina Courage owners
Former United States citizens
Sportspeople from Pembroke Pines, Florida
Sportspeople from Osaka
Tennis people from Florida
US Open (tennis) champions
Asia Game Changer Award winners
Laureus World Sports Awards winners
Olympic cauldron lighters
Olympic tennis players of Japan
Tennis players at the 2020 Summer Olympics
WTA number 1 ranked singles tennis players
Japanese human rights activists
American human rights activists
American social activists
Black Lives Matter people
20th-century Japanese women